Saints & Sinners is the second studio album by English-Canadian girl group All Saints. It was released three years after their debut album, All Saints. The album reached number one in the UK, their only album to do so. Three tracks on the album were produced by William Orbit, best known for his work with Madonna on her Ray of Light album. The album received mixed reviews from music critics, praising the singles and the new direction of music, while some felt it was too similar to the Spice Girls and Madonna's album Ray of Light.

Three singles were released from the album: "Pure Shores", "Black Coffee" and "All Hooked Up". Promo copies of the track "Surrender" began circulating in early January 2001, indicating it would have been the fourth proper single from the album had the group not disbanded soon after the album's release. The first single from the album, the Orbit-produced "Pure Shores", preceded the album by several months, having been previously released on the soundtrack for the 2000 film The Beach. It topped the UK Singles Chart and was certified Platinum. Second single "Black Coffee" also got to number one in the UK, whilst final single "All Hooked Up" peaked at number seven.

The majority of the songs were written by Shaznay Lewis and Karl Gordon. Melanie Blatt wrote two tracks on the album, "I Feel You" and "Ha Ha", the former track being written in dedication to her daughter, while Natalie Appleton co-wrote the track "Dreams" with Samantha Fox. Fox said she is credited on the song as "Karen Wilkin". Commercially, Saints & Sinners wasn't as successful as its preceding album.

Background
In 1999, three of the group's members – Nicole Appleton, Natalie Appleton and Melanie Blatt – were approached by Dave Stewart to appear on the film Honest, playing the main characters. At the same time, remaining member Shaznay Lewis went to the United States to work with William Orbit, noted for his work with American singer and songwriter Madonna, on the songs and backing tracks for All Saints' second album, provisionally titled I Need the Mic. In December 1999, reports confirmed that All Saints completed recording for the album, and set its release date for March or April 2000. "The album is finished and we are now mastering it. It has great tracks on it. We were even working on the mixing desks. We wanted to get involved with every aspect of the album right down to the final version", said Shaznay Lewis.

Critical reception
 
Saints & Sinners received mixed reviews from music critics. NME stated: "It's better than the new Spice Girls record. But really, that's not good enough." They criticised the group's lack of new musical direction, saying "[...] But since the release of their first album and their meteoric rise to tabloid infamy, they seem to be on a mission to tear down that credibility, brick by brick." Although praising the singles, they concluded that "For a British pop album, 'Saints And Sinners' is simply passable." Entertainment.ie however were more positive, giving it four stars out of five. They felt that "Saints and Sinners is a confident set of vibrant R'n'B songs driven by swirling dance rhythms and some luscious harmonies." They further judged: "At heart the Saints are superlative singers and the unique chemistry conjured up by their four individual voices makes this one of the best pop albums of the year."

Despite AllMusic not reviewing the album, they awarded it three stars out of five. They highlighted "Pure Shores", "Black Coffee" and "Dreams" as the album's standout tracks. Nigel Packer from BBC Music gave Saints & Sinners a positive review, but remarked: "It's a sign of just what Saints and Sinners might have been with Orbit at the helm throughout. Instead we're left with one strong EP trapped inside a pretty run-of-the-mill album."

Commercial reception
Commercially, Saints & Sinners was not as successful as the group's self-titled debut album. While debuting at number eight on the New Zealand Albums Chart, it stayed in the chart for just five weeks. The album debuted at twenty-six on the Australian Albums Chart, and rose to peak at twenty. Although the album charted in the top fifty for three weeks, it was later certified Gold by ARIA. In Norway and Sweden, the album reached the top 20 (fifteen and nineteen, respectively) but lasted for less than a month in the charts (at four and three weeks, respectively).

The album was not so successful in Austria, where it debuted at twelve for two consecutive weeks and spent five weeks in the chart. It was more moderate in Switzerland, where it debuted at seven on the Swiss Albums Chart and charted for ten weeks. The album peaked at fourteen in Germany and endured for eleven weeks in the chart. The album was more successful in their native United Kingdom, where it peaked at number one for a sole week. It clocked up a total of twenty-three weeks in the chart.

Singles
The album's first single was "Pure Shores". It was released as the lead single from the album by London Records in Australia, New Zealand, Canada, and United Kingdom on 12 September 1999, until a physical worldwide release occurred on 11 February 2000. The song was also used as the first single for the 2000 film The Beach and its soundtrack. Composed as a "futuristic dream-pop" song, "Pure Shores" received very positive reviews from music critics, many praising the group's vocals, musical composition, and lyrical content. Commercially, the song was a huge success, peaking high on the charts in many countries including Ireland, New Zealand, Italy, United Kingdom, Australia, Finland, France, and Switzerland. The song was released in Canada, but only charted at thirty-five, and was their last single to chart in North America. The music video is set on the beach and features clips from the movie The Beach.

The album's second single was "Black Coffee". It was released by London Records worldwide on 2 October 2000. Composed as a dance-pop, trip hop, and electronica song, "Black Coffee" received positive reviews from music critics, many again praising the musical composition and the group's vocals. While not managing to reach the heights of lead single "Pure Shores", "Black Coffee" still reached number one in the United Kingdom, also charting in Australia, Ireland, Italy, New Zealand, Sweden, and Switzerland. The music video is set in a luxury apartment and on the rooftop of the apartment during the night.

The album's third and final single was "All Hooked Up". It was released by London Records worldwide on 27 January 2001. It was the group's last single prior to their temporary split. The song did not match the success of the album's previous singles, reaching no.7 in the United Kingdom, Ireland, New Zealand, and Switzerland. The video for "All Hooked Up" is set in a hotel room.

Track listing

Charts

Weekly charts

Year-end charts

Certifications and sales

References

External links
 Official site

2000 albums
All Saints (group) albums
Albums produced by Cameron McVey
Albums produced by William Orbit